Agustí Roc Amador (born 28 August 1971) is a Spanish ski mountaineer and long-distance runner. He is a three-time champion of the Skyrunner World Series from 2002 to 2004, European vertical race champion in 2005, and Spanish vertical race champion from 2005 to 2007.

Selected results

Ski mountaineering 
 2004:
 4th, World Championship relay race, together with Javier Martín de Villa, Dani León Roca, and Manuel Pérez Brunicardi
 2005:
 1st, European Championship vertical race
 1st, Spanish Championship vertical race
 2nd, Spanish Cup
 2nd, Spanish Championship single race
 2006:
 1st, Spanish Championship vertical race
 3rd, Spanish Championship single race
 4th, World Championship vertical race
 6th, World Championship relay race, together with Javier Martín de Villa, Federico Galera Díez, and Manuel Pérez Brunicardi
 2007:
 1st, Spanish Championship vertical race
 2nd, European Championship vertical race
 4th, European Championship relay race, together with Javier Martín de Villa, Marc Solá Pastoret, and Manuel Pérez Brunicardi
 2008:
 6th, World Championship vertical race

Mountain running/skyrunning 
 2002: Skyrunner World Series champion
 2003: Skyrunner World Series champion
 1st, Maraton Alpino Madrileno, Spain
 2004: Skyrunner World Series champion
 2006:
 1st, Dolomites SkyRace, Italy
 2008:
 1st, Mount Kinabalu Climbathon, Malaysia
 1st, Ben Nevis Race, Fort William, Scotland
 2009:
 7th, Skyrunner World Series

World Cup wins

References

External links 
 Further race results
 

1971 births
Living people
Spanish male long-distance runners
Spanish male ski mountaineers
Duathletes
Spanish sky runners
Ski mountaineers from Catalonia
People from Baix Llobregat
Sportspeople from the Province of Barcelona
Athletes from Catalonia